Josiah Masters (November 22, 1763 – June 30, 1822) was a United States representative from New York. Born in Woodbury, Litchfield County, Connecticut, he was graduated from Yale College in 1783. He studied law, was admitted to the bar and commenced practice in Schaghticoke, Rensselaer County, New York. He was a member of the New York State Assembly in 1792, 1800, and 1801, and served as supervisor of Schaghticoke in 1796. He was a justice of the peace in Rensselaer County from 1801 to 1805, was a trustee of Lansingburgh Academy, and was school commissioner of Schaghticoke.

Masters was elected as a Democratic-Republican to the Ninth and Tenth Congresses, holding office from March 4, 1805 to March 3, 1809. He was founder of the Schaghticoke Powder Co. and judge of the Court of Common Pleas of Rensselaer County from 1808 to 1822. He died in Fairfield, Connecticut in 1822; interment was in the Masters Cemetery, near Schaghticoke, New York.

References

1763 births
1822 deaths
Yale College alumni
People from Woodbury, Connecticut
People from Schaghticoke, New York
Members of the New York State Assembly
New York (state) state court judges
Democratic-Republican Party members of the United States House of Representatives from New York (state)